KJFX (95.7 FM, "The Fox") is a commercial radio station located in Fresno, California, and owned by One Putt Broadcasting.  KJFX airs a classic rock music format.  Its studios are located at 1415 Fulton Street in downtown Fresno. The transmitter is northeast of Clovis.

KJFX broadcasts two channels in HD.

History
The origin of this station goes back to legendary radio owner, Gene Chenault. He owned the "Boss Radio" KYNO (AM 1300). The FCC granted a new license in 1970 for 95.5 MHz. Call letters were KYNO-FM and later changed to KPHD in 1972. The first music to be played was the automated "Hit Parade '70" in early 1970. Boss Radio was on the AM side and the Drake-Chenault provided programming kicked off the FM. KPHD changed their call letters to KYNO-FM in 1977. KYNO-FM moved from 95.5 to 95.7 MHz in 1984. The station was originally an automated playing the Drake-Chenault Hit Parade 70 format adopting the call letters of KYNO-FM.  The format was later changed to a rock format, branded as "Rock 96 FM". The format changed to disco in 1978. In the 1980s, the format was changed to Top 40 branded as "96 FM" to compete with KBOS and KMGX. In the late 1980s, the branding was changed to "Hot 96".

In February 1990, the format was changed to a classic rock music format with a change to its present call letters, KJFX.

On Tuesday, November 25, 2014, KJFX and sister stations KFRR and KJZN were purchased by One Putt from Wilks Broadcasting.  On January 30, 2015, the purchase was consummated.

The Fox today
The Fox is a dominant music station with men in Central California despite a crowded radio market. Current staff/programing consists of the Bob and Tom Show, Kacy Allen,Koyote, Jeff Mora, Big Dog and the syndicated Pink Floyd program "Floydian Slip."

References

External links
KJFX official website
KJFX MySpace Page

JFX
Radio stations established in 1970
Classic rock radio stations in the United States
1970 establishments in California